The Ryokufūkai (lit. Green Breeze Society) was a political party in Japan.

History
The party was established in the House of Councillors in March 1964 following a split in the Dai-Niin Club. Its name was taken from the original Ryokufūkai which had merged into the Dōshikai in 1960, with the Dōshikai merging into Dai-Niin Club in 1962.

The party was disbanded in June 1965.

References

Defunct political parties in Japan
Political parties established in 1964
1964 establishments in Japan
Political parties disestablished in 1965
1965 disestablishments in Japan